The 2014–15 season was Shirak's 24th consecutive season in the Armenian Premier League and covers the period from 1 July 2014 to 30 June 2015.

Squad

Transfers

In

Loan in

Out

Released

Competitions

Premier League

Results summary

Results

Table

Armenian Cup

UEFA Europa League

Qualifying rounds

Statistics

Appearances and goals

|-
|colspan="16"|Players away on loan:
|-
|colspan="16"|Players who left Shirak during the season:

|}

Goal scorers

Clean sheets

Disciplinary Record

References

Shirak SC seasons
Shirak